The Amoureux House, sometimes called the Beauvais–Amoureux House, is in Ste. Geneviève, Missouri. It was built in 1792 by Jean-Baptiste St. Gemme Beauvais II who moved from Kaskaskia, Illinois. In 1852, it was purchased by Benjamin C. Amoureux, who immigrated to the United States from France.

It is currently operated as a museum by the National Park Service. It is one of three surviving poteaux-en-terre buildings in Ste. Genevieve and one of five surviving in the entire United States. The other Ste. Genevieve poteaux-en-terre buildings are the Bequette-Ribault House and the Vital St. Gemme Beauvais House I (20 S. Main Street).  The remaining two are the LaPointe-Krebs House in Pascagoula, Mississippi and the Badin-Roque House near Natchitoches, Louisiana.  The Lasource–Durand Cabin is located behind the Amoureux House.

Galleries

Amoureux House

Lasource–Durand Cabin

References 

 Sainte Geneviève
French architecture

External links 
 Amoureux House
 Amoureux House — Sainte Genevieve, Missouri

French-American culture in Missouri
Museums in Ste. Genevieve County, Missouri
Historic house museums in Missouri
Houses in Ste. Genevieve County, Missouri
Houses on the National Register of Historic Places in Missouri
Missouri Territory
New France
French colonial architecture
National Register of Historic Places in Ste. Genevieve County, Missouri
Houses completed in 1792